In mathematics, the Tsen rank of a field describes conditions under which a system of polynomial equations must have a solution in the field.  The concept is named for C. C. Tsen, who introduced their study in 1936.

We consider a system of m polynomial equations in n variables over a field F.  Assume that the equations all have constant term zero, so that (0, 0, ... ,0) is a common solution.  We say that F is a Ti-field if every such system, of degrees d1, ..., dm has a common non-zero solution whenever 

The Tsen rank of F is the smallest i such that F is a Ti-field.  We say that the Tsen rank of F is infinite if it is not a Ti-field for any i (for example, if it is formally real).

Properties
 A field has Tsen rank zero if and only if it is algebraically closed.
 A finite field has Tsen rank 1: this is the Chevalley–Warning theorem.
 If F is algebraically closed then rational function field F(X) has Tsen rank 1.
 If F has Tsen rank i, then the rational function field F(X) has Tsen rank at most i + 1.
 If F has Tsen rank i, then an algebraic extension of F  has Tsen rank at most i.
 If F has Tsen rank i, then an extension of F of transcendence degree k has Tsen rank at most i + k. 
 There exist fields of Tsen rank i for every integer i ≥ 0.

Norm form
We define a norm form of level i on a field F to be a homogeneous polynomial of degree d in n=di variables with only the trivial zero over F (we exclude the case n=d=1).  The existence of a norm form on level i on F implies that F is of Tsen rank at least i − 1.  If E is an extension of F of finite degree n > 1, then the field norm form for E/F is a norm form of level 1.  If F admits a norm form of level i then the rational function field F(X) admits a norm form of level i + 1.  This allows us to demonstrate the existence of fields of any given Tsen rank.

Diophantine dimension
The Diophantine dimension of a field is the smallest natural number k, if it exists, such that the field of is class Ck: that is, such that any homogeneous polynomial of degree d in N variables has a non-trivial zero whenever N >  dk.  Algebraically closed fields are of Diophantine dimension 0; quasi-algebraically closed fields of dimension 1.

Clearly if a field is Ti then it is Ci, and T0 and C0 are equivalent, each being equivalent to being algebraically closed.  It is not known whether Tsen rank and Diophantine dimension are equal in general.

See also
 Tsen's theorem

References 

 
 

Field (mathematics)
Diophantine geometry